The 1994–95 Tulane Green Wave men's basketball team represented Tulane University in the 1994–95 college basketball season. This was head coach Perry Clark's sixth season at Tulane. The Green Wave competed in the Metro Conference and played their home games at Devlin Fieldhouse. They finished the season 23–10 (7–5 in Metro play) and finished second in the conference regular season standings. Tulane lost in the quarterfinal round of the Metro Conference tournament, but received an at-large bid to the 1995 NCAA tournament. The Green Wave defeated  in the opening round before losing to No. 1 seed Kentucky in the round of 32.

This season marked the school's third NCAA Tournament appearance in a 4-year span, with Tulane reaching the second round each time. To date, this season is Tulane's most recent appearance in the NCAA Tournament.

Roster

Schedule and results

|-
!colspan=9 style=| Regular season

|-
!colspan=9 style=| Metro Conference tournament

|-
!colspan=9 style=| NCAA tournament

Rankings

References

Tulane
Tulane Green Wave men's basketball seasons
Tulane
Tulane
Tulane